Julio César Arzú (born 5 June 1954) a.k.a. Tile is a retired Honduran football player.

Club career
Nicknamed Tile, Arzú has played for Honduran side Real España, in Spain for Racing de Santander and had a spell with ADET in El Salvador. With España he once kept successive clean sheets totalling 686 minutes.

International career
Arzú has represented Honduras at the 1977 FIFA World Youth Championship. He played for the senior squad in 13 FIFA World Cup qualification matches and was their starting goalkeeper at the 1982 FIFA World Cup Finals in Spain.

Personal life
Arzú currently trains the female junior varsity team at Escuela Internacional Sampedrana. He was briefly the Goalkeeping Coach for the national team in the 2006 World Cup Qualification.

References

External links
 Pictures - La Prensa

1954 births
Living people
People from Tela
Honduran footballers
Honduras international footballers
Honduran expatriate footballers
1982 FIFA World Cup players
Real C.D. España players
Racing de Santander players
C.D. Olimpia players
Liga Nacional de Fútbol Profesional de Honduras players
La Liga players
Honduran expatriate sportspeople in El Salvador
Honduran expatriate sportspeople in Spain
Expatriate footballers in Spain
Expatriate footballers in El Salvador
CONCACAF Championship-winning players
Association football goalkeepers